Geastrum welwitschii is a species of fungus in the earthstar family. When young and unopened, the fruit bodies resemble small spheres lying in the soil. As the mushroom matures, the thick leathery outer layer of tissue (the peridium) splits star-like to form a number of fleshy arms, which curve downward to reveal the inner spore sac that contains the fertile tissue known as the gleba. The spore sac has a narrow grooved opening at the top where the spores are released. First collected from Spain in the mid-19th century, the fungus is distributed in Europe, North America, and Bermuda.

Taxonomy

The fungus was first collected in Spain by the Austrian explorer and botanist Friedrich Welwitsch. British mycologist Miles Joseph Berkeley obtained the specimens and thought them to be Geastrum fimbriatum. He sent a specimen to the French mycologist Camille Montagne in 1856, who named it Geaster Welwitschii (Geaster is an orthographical variant of Geastrum). Patricio Ponce de León in his 1968 world monograph of Geastrum, considered the species a fornicate variety of G. javanicum, and described it as Geastrum javanicum var. welwitschii; this is now a synonym.

According to Stanek's infrageneric (ranks below the level of genus) concept of the genus Geastrum, G. welwitschii is classified in the section Basimyceliata, which includes species in which the outer part of the mycelial layer do not incorporate sand and encrusting debris. It is further classified in the subsection Laevistomata because its peristome (an opening at the top of the spore sac) is even to fibrillose (with fibrils).

Description
The mature fruit body of G. welwitschii is small to medium-sized, with a fornicate spore sac, meaning that the spore sac is raised into the air as the rays press down. Unlike some other earthstar fungi, the mycelial layer does not encrust debris as the fruit body develops. The peristome is even, and has an indistinct boundary. The young fruit bodies just prior to opening are found near the surface of the ground, and are rounded, with or without an umbo, and attached to the substrate with a basal mycelial tuft or cord. The expanded fruit body is small to medium-sized. The fornicate exoperidium (outer peridium) has the upper, arched part (fibrous and pseudoparenchymatous layers) split to about the half-way point or more into 4–7 rays. The mycelial cup is free (only attached at its base), with 4–7 more or less well-developed lobes corresponding to the 4–7 rays.

The pseudoparenchymatous layer (a layer of thin-walled, usually angular, randomly arranged cells that are tightly packed) is initially beige, later brownish, in age dark brown, cracked and if moist reddish brown. The fibrous layer is beige-colored, with its outer side free from the mycelial layer except at the tips of the rays. The mycelial layer has a beige brown to somewhat yellowish-brown, felted to tufted outer surface, darkening to reddish-brown if moist. It is not encrusted with debris, but some debris and sand may adhere. The inner side is smooth, dull to somewhat glossy, and hazelnut brown.

The endoperidium (inner peridium) is more or less smooth to the unaided eye, but densely protruding light to grayish-brown hyphal tips are present. The peristome is indistinctly delimited (without distinct boundaries), and the mouth area fibrillose. The columella is not well-developed, and broadly club-shaped to columnar; in cross-section it is whitish to pale beige. The mature gleba is brown and powdery.

The spores of Geastrum welwitschii are roughly spherical, sometimes contain an oil droplet, and measure 4.5–5.5 μm in diameter. Scanning electron microscopy has revealed that the spore surface is covered with column-like processes, up to 0.45 μm high, that may be more or less confluent.

Similar species

Geastrum welwitschii is morphologically similar to G. fornicatum in having fornicate, mostly 3–6 rays, of exoperidia and a cup-shaped mycelial layer. Geastrum welwitschii is distinguished from G. fornicatum by its epigeal mycelial cup with a felted or tufted outer surface.

Geastrum welwitschii also has similar morphological characters to G. minimum in having small fruit bodies, whitish spore sacs, and fibrillose peristomes. However G. welwitschii is differentiated from G. minimum by its fornicate, mostly 3–6, rays of the exoperidia, and the mycelial layer that easily loosens from the fibrous layer to form a mycelial cup. G. welwitschii is distinguished from G. entomophilum by its dark and sessile endoperidium, and smaller spores (2.8–3.5 μm).

According to mycologists Hemmes and Desjardin, the most common earthstar in the coastal Casuarina forests of Hawaii is a species "closely allied" with G. welwitschii, which they name Geastrum aff. welwitschii. It differs from the main species in its much coarser pyramidal warts on the exoperidial surface, a sessile and sac-shaped endoperidial body, and smaller spores. They likened the roughened outer surface of the exoperidium to lychee fruit.

Habitat and distribution
The fungus is saprobic, and grows on the ground, in leaf litter, or on decomposing wood. It has been collected in Spain, South Carolina, Florida, and Bermuda.

Notes

References

External links

welwitschii
Inedible fungi
Fungi of Europe